Pachytrype is a genus of fungi in the family Calosphaeriaceae containing 3 species.

References

External links 

Sordariomycetes genera
Calosphaeriales